Liana Pia Coronado Guanio-Mago (born October 24, 1974) is a Filipina actress and television presenter. She is head anchor for the entertainment program Showbiz Central. She is also the former showbiz segment anchor for the GMA Network primetime newscast 24 Oras and one of the co-host of the longest-running noontime show Eat Bulaga!.

Career
Guanio was born on October 24, 1974. She began her career in entertainment as a lively traffic reporter for CALTEX's RoadWatch In 1999. Guanio caught the attention of travelogue channel Lakbay TV and her career has been on the move ever since.

After Lakbay TV, Guanio was one of the hosts of ABS-CBN's morning show Alas Singko Y Medya. Her biggest career move though was when she transferred from the ABS-CBN to GMA Network In 2003 when she became a regular host of Philippines longest running noontime show Eat Bulaga!, as a segment newscaster In 24 Oras Chika Minute and in a Sunday talk show program S-Files.

Personal life
Pia Guanio has been romantically linked in the past to her long-time boyfriend, Mark Zulueta, and was later said to be engaged to variety show entertainer and actor Vic Sotto. Sotto and Guanio broke up In 2010. Several months later, Guanio met businessman Steve Mago and tied the knot In 2011. The couple produced two children: Scarlet Janine (b. 2012). and Soleil Brooklyn (b. 2017). Her birth caused her to be on hiatus from Eat Bulaga! and 24 Oras, and officially left the later In 2015. and was later replaced by Iya Villania.

Filmography

Films

Television

As herself

As actress

Awards

References
Footnotes

External links

1974 births
Living people
Filipino television variety show hosts
GMA Network personalities
GMA Integrated News and Public Affairs people
21st-century Filipino actresses